Screen Associates Films is a series of 29 half-hour American anthology dramas produced by Screen Televideo Productions/Flamingo Films.  Eight episodes originally aired on Your Jeweler's Showcase on CBS.  Those episodes and the remaining twenty-one aired in first-run syndication as Televideo Theater from 1952 to 1953.

Your Jeweler's Showcase episodes were:
 Like Rich People 
 Operation ESP
 A Study in Charcoal
 Teacher of the Year
 Tenampa
 Marked X
 Tiger Bait 
 Something for Ginger

Guest stars included Ruth Warrick, Martha Hyer, Sheldon Leonard, Peggy Castle, Darryl Hickman, Jack Kruschen, and Jeanette Nolan

References

External links
Screen Associates Films at CVTA with episode list

1952 American television series debuts
1953 American television series endings
1950s American anthology television series
CBS original programming